Jeremy Denk (born May 16, 1970 in Durham, North Carolina) is an American classical pianist.

Early life
Denk did not come from a musical family. After several years in New Jersey, his family settled in Las Cruces, New Mexico, where he grew up. He attended Oberlin College and did graduate work at Indiana University where he studied with György Sebők.

Career 

Denk has won a MacArthur "Genius" Fellowship, the Avery Fisher Prize, and Musical America's Instrumentalist of the Year award, and has been elected to the American Academy of Arts and Sciences.

Denk has performed throughout the US and Europe in recital and with major symphony orchestras and has toured with Academy of St Martin in the Fields.

Denk's releases from Nonesuch Records include the opera The Classical Style with music by Haydn, Mozart, and Beethoven. He joined his long-time musical partners, Joshua Bell and Steven Isserlis, in a recording of Brahms' Trio in B-major. His previous disc of the Goldberg Variations reached number one on Billboards Classical Chart.

In 2014 Denk served as music director of the Ojai Music Festival, for which, besides performing and curating, he wrote the libretto for a comic opera, The Classical Style, with music by Steven Stucky. The opera was later presented by Carnegie Hall and the Aspen Festival. Denk is known for his original and insightful writing on music, which Alex Ross praises for its "arresting sensitivity and wit." His writing has appeared in The New Yorker, The New Republic, The Guardian, and on the front page of The New York Times Book Review. One of his New Yorker contributions, "Every Good Boy Does Fine" (cf. EGBDF), forms the basis of a book published by Random House in the US, and Macmillan in the UK. Recounting his experiences of touring, performing, and practicing, his blog, Think Denk, was recently selected for inclusion in the Library of Congress web archives.Think Denk It's a pun: "denk" is German for "think".

In 2012, Denk made his Nonesuch debut with a pairing of masterpieces old and new: Beethoven's final Piano Sonata No. 32, Op. 111, and Ligeti's Études. The album was named one of the best of 2012 by The New Yorker, NPR, and The Washington Post, and Denk's account of the Beethoven sonata was selected by BBC Radio 3's Building a Library as the best available version recorded on modern piano. Denk has a long-standing attachment to the music of American visionary Charles Ives, and his recording of Ives's two piano sonatas featured in many "best of the year" lists.

Denk graduated from Oberlin College, Indiana University, and the Juilliard School. He lives in New York City.

In 2019, Denk released an album entitled c.1300–c.2000, of piano versions of pieces by composers from circa the years 1300 to 2000. The album was released on Nonesuch Records. He discussed the work on BBC Radio 4's Front Row in March 2019.

Denk made his Edinburgh International Festival debut in August 2019 with a programme of piano works by Bach, Ligeti, Liszt, Berg and Schumann.

Recordings
September 2013: J.S. Bach: Goldberg Variations, Nonesuch Records
November 2012: American Mavericks, including Henry Cowell's Synchrony and Piano Concerto with Michael Tilson Thomas, SFS Media
May 2012: Ligeti/Beethoven, including Books I and II of György Ligeti's piano études and Beethoven's Piano Sonata No. 32, Nonesuch Records
January 2012: French Impressions, including sonatas of Franck, Ravel, and Saint-Saëns with violinist Joshua Bell, Sony Classical
October 2010: Jeremy Denk Plays Ives, which features Charles Ives' Piano Sonatas Nos. 1 and 2, on his Think Denk Media Label
Bach Partitas 3, 4, 6. Azica Records
Works for Solo Piano by Leon Kirchner. Sonata No. 2 for Piano. Albany Records
Tobias Picker's Piano Concerto No. 2 ("Keys to the City"). Russian Philharmonic. Thomas Sanderling, conductor. Chandos Records
John Corigliano Violin Sonata. Joshua Bell, violin. Sony Records
Gabriel Fauré Violin Sonata. Chausson Concert. Soovin Kim/Jupiter String Quartet. Azica Records
Brahms and Dvořák Quintets, with Concertante Chamber Ensemble. Meridian Records
February 2019: c. 1300–c. 2000, Nonesuch Records
September 2021: Mozart Piano Concertos'', with Saint Paul Chamber Orchestra, Nonesuch Records

Bibliography

References

External links
Jeremy Denk's official website
Jeremy Denk's Opus 3 Artists page
The Bard College Conservatory of Music
Classical Archives Interview

  Profile on CBS Sunday Morning 3/20/22

1970 births
Living people
20th-century classical musicians
20th-century classical pianists
21st-century classical pianists
American classical pianists
American male classical pianists
American opera librettists
Bard College faculty
Indiana University alumni
Jacobs School of Music faculty
Juilliard School alumni
MacArthur Fellows
Oberlin Conservatory of Music alumni
Musicians from Durham, North Carolina
The New Yorker people
20th-century American pianists
21st-century American pianists
20th-century American male musicians
21st-century American male musicians